Christophe Lavainne (born 22 December 1963 in Châteaudun, Eure-et-Loir) is a French former professional bicycle racer. Lavaine was a two time French national cyclo-cross champion, and won a stage in the 1987 Tour de France.

Major results

Road

1984
 1st  Overall Tour de Luxembourg
1985
 1st Prologue Tour de Luxembourg
 3rd Paris–Camembert
 7th GP Ouest–France
1986
 1st Stage 2 (TTT) Tour de France
 3rd Grand Prix de Denain
 4th Overall Tirreno–Adriatico
 10th Overall Tour de Luxembourg
1987
 1st Stage 6 Tour de France
 1st Stage 4 Circuit de la Sarthe
 9th Overall Ronde van Nederland
 10th Grand Prix de Wallonie
1988
 1st Stage 1 Tour of Ireland
 3rd Grand Prix de Mauléon-Moulins
 4th Overall Ronde van Nederland
 4th Paris–Brussels
 6th Elfstedenronde
1989
 1st Stage 2 (TTT) Tour de France
 4th Grand Prix de Fourmies
1990
 1st  Overall Tour de Luxembourg
 6th Overall Four Days of Dunkirk
1992
 1st Stages 3 & 5a Herald Sun Tour

Grand Tour general classification results timeline

Cyclo-cross
1986–1987
 2nd National Championships
 3rd  UCI World Championships
1987–1988
 1st  National Championships
 5th UCI World Championships
1988–1989
 1st Pétange
 1st Rumelange
 3rd National Championships
 5th UCI World Championships
1989–1990
 1st  National Championships

External links 

Official Tour de France results for Christophe Lavainne

1963 births
Living people
People from Châteaudun
French male cyclists
Cyclo-cross cyclists
French Tour de France stage winners
Sportspeople from Eure-et-Loir
Cyclists from Centre-Val de Loire